The 1989 Cork Senior Hurling Championship was the 101st staging of the Cork Senior Hurling Championship since its establishment by the Cork County Board in 1887. The draw for the opening fixtures took place on 18 December 1988. The championship began on 29 April 1989 and ended on 1 October 1989.

St. Finbarr's entered the championship as the defending champions, however, they were beaten by Sarsfields in a semi-final replay.

On 1 October 1989, Glen Rovers won the championship following a 4-15 to 3-13 defeat of Sarsfields in the final. This was their 25th championship title and their first in thirteen championship seasons. This was their 25th championship title overall and their first since 1976.

Sarsfields' Tadhg Murphy was the championship's top scorer with 3-27.

Results

First round

Second round

Quarter-finals

Semi-finals

Final

Championship statistics

Scoring

Top scorers overall

Top scorers in a single game

Miscellaneous

 Sarsfields qualified for the final for the first time since 1957.

References

Cork Senior Hurling Championship
Cork Senior Hurling Championship